James Law (c. 1560–1632) was an Archbishop of Glasgow. 

James or Jim Law may also refer to:

James Law (veterinary surgeon) (1838–1921), British-American veterinarian
James H. Law (1899–?), American football coach
James O. Law (1809–1847), American politician and merchant
James R. Law Jr. (1885–1952), American politician
James Thomas Law (1790–1876), English cleric who was chancellor of the diocese of Lichfield